Denis Blanchette (born September 4, 1956) is a Canadian politician, who was elected to the House of Commons of Canada in the 2011 election. He represented the electoral district of Louis-Hébert as a member of the New Democratic Party until 2015.

Blanchette ran in Louis-Hébert twice, in 2006 and 2008, before being elected. Prior to winning office he was a computer analyst and public servant.

In May 2017 Blanchette was selected as president of the New Democratic Party of Quebec. He was the candidate for the NDPQ in the October 2, 2017 by-election held in the district of Louis-Hébert. He finished 7th with 1.3 per cent of the vote. He resigned as president of the NDPQ in 2018 citing personal reasons. Blanchette again contested Louis-Hébert in the 2021 federal election as a candidate for the Green Party.

Electoral record

Federal

Louis-Hébert

Provincial

Louis-Hebert

References

External links

1956 births
French Quebecers
Living people
Members of the House of Commons of Canada from Quebec
New Democratic Party MPs
Politicians from Quebec City
Université Laval alumni
21st-century Canadian politicians
New Democratic Party of Quebec candidates in Quebec provincial elections
Green Party of Canada candidates in the 2021 Canadian federal election